Muyeveld or Muijeveld is a hamlet in the Dutch province of North Holland. It is a part of the municipality of Wijdemeren, and lies about 8 km southwest of Hilversum.

According to Van der Aa, the hamlet was formerly known as "Mijndenveld", referring to the nearby polder and hamlet of Mijnden.

References

Populated places in North Holland
Wijdemeren